Rhopobota furcata is a species of moth of the family Tortricidae. It is found in Gansu, China.

The wingspan is 14.5–16 mm. The ground colour of the forewings is grey, with a darker costa. The hindwings are grey.

Etymology
The species name refers to the brown bifurcate streak on the forewings and is derived from Latin furcatus (meaning forked, branched).

References

Moths described in 2005
Eucosmini